"Slip Into Something More Comfortable" is a single released in July 2000 by the British electronic group Kinobe. It features sampling from the work of Englebert Humperdinck, primarily from the intro to Humperdinck's "From Here to Eternity" recorded in 1968.

It appeared on the album Soundphiles, released on 17 July 2000, as track 6. The music was published by Zomba Music Publishers Ltd.

Production
It was produced with Ben & Jason. It features harps and glissandi violins.

Film music
The music has appeared in films:
 Disco Pigs (2001)
 School for Seduction (2004)

Other
 Burn the Floor musical
 Television advert for Kronenbourg 1664, entitled Femme Fatale (2001)

Similar music
 LeRoy Holmes 1968 album Los Violines del Amor, from the intro of Inolvidable
 Underwater Love (Smoke City song) (1997)

References

2000 singles
Zomba Group of Companies